Deering City is an unincorporated community in Frankfort Township, Franklin County, Illinois, United States.

Notes

Unincorporated communities in Illinois
Unincorporated communities in Franklin County, Illinois